Perseverance Island is an artificial island in Seychelles, lying 2 km from the capital Victoria.

History
The island was created artificially during the 2000s. It belongs to the Mahe Port Islands, which are mostly artificial islands created by funds from Dubai when the Dubai dredger was placed in Seychelles.
In 2013 work on the island had begun.
By 2020, the island should house 10,000, more than 15% of the population of Seychelles

Administration
Perseverance Island is administered as the districts Ile Perseverance I and Ile Perseverance II.

Tourism
The island's plan is mostly residential. There is a large Army Naval base at the south point.

References

External links 

 info
 Mahe Map 2015
 Info on the island

Artificial islands of Seychelles
Islands of Mahé Islands